That's Impossible is a television series on the History Channel that examined seemingly impossible technologies based upon stories and inventions in history, and detailed exactly what was needed to turn them into reality. The show premiered on July 7, 2009 and was narrated by Jonathan Frakes.

Format
A series that examined seemingly impossible stories and inventions from history, and the technology that could have turned science fiction into reality.

Each episode had a "to do list", which means that if this technology were to be perfected, it would have to do certain things on the list. That's Impossible also mentioned previous attempts or possible accomplishments of said technology.

Episodes

References

External links

2009 American television series debuts
History (American TV channel) original programming